Bernard Sande is a Malawian civil servant and diplomat. He is the Malawian Ambassador to the United Kingdom. Prior to this appointment, he was the Malawian Ambassador to the United States. He has also worked as a diplomat in Germany in the past, and he served for a time as Principal Secretary for Education, Foreign Service and Private Sector Development.

Career
He is Malawi's Ambassador to the U.K. and is deputized by John Tembo Jr.

References

Malawian diplomats
Living people
Year of birth missing (living people)